There are 13 stadiums in use by Florida Complex League baseball teams, all located in Florida. The oldest is Publix Field at Joker Marchant Stadium (1966) in Lakeland, home of the Tigers. The newest stadium is CoolToday Park (2019) in North Port, the home field of the Braves. Three stadiums were built in the 1960s, one in the 1970s, and three in each of the 1980s, 1990s, and 2010s. The highest seating capacity is 11,000 at the Yankees' George M. Steinbrenner Field; the lowest capacity is 500 at the Carpenter Complex, where the Phillies play. All stadiums have a grass surface.

Stadiums
{|class="wikitable sortable plainrowheaders"
|-
! Name
! Team(s)
! Location
! Opened
! Capacity
! class="unsortable" | Ref(s)
|-
! scope="row" | Bobby Mattick Training Center at Englebert Complex
| FCL Blue Jays
| Dunedin
| 1978
| align="right" | 5,500
| 
|-
! scope="row" | Carpenter Complex
| FCL Phillies
| Clearwater
| 1967
| align="right" | 500
| 
|-
! scope="row" | Charlotte Sports Park
| FCL Rays
| Port Charlotte
| 1988
| align="right" | 7,000
| 
|-
! scope="row" | Clover Park
| FCL Mets
| Port St. Lucie
| 1988
| align="right" | 7,160
| 
|-
! scope="row" | CoolToday Park
| FCL Braves
| North Port
| 2019
| align="right" | 9,500
| 
|-
! scope="row" | Ed Smith Stadium
| FCL Orioles
| Sarasota
| 1989
| align="right" | 8,340
| 
|-
! scope="row" | FITTEAM Ballpark of the Palm Beaches
| FCL Astros Blue/OrangeFCL Nationals
| West Palm Beach
| 2017
| align="right" | 6,500
| 
|-
! scope="row" | George M. Steinbrenner Field
| FCL Yankees
| Tampa
| 1996
| align="right" | 11,000
| 
|-
! scope="row" | JetBlue Park at Fenway South
| FCL Red Sox
| Fort Myers
| 2012
| align="right" | 8,000
| 
|-
! scope="row" | Lee County Sports Complex
| FCL Twins
| Fort Myers
| 1991
| align="right" | 7,500
| 
|-
! scope="row" | Pirate City
| FCL Pirates
| Bradenton
| 1969
| align="right" | 7,500
| 
|-
! scope="row" | Publix Field at Joker Marchant Stadium
| FCL Tigers
| Lakeland
| 1966
| align="right" | 8,500
| 
|-
! scope="row" | Roger Dean Stadium
| FCL CardinalsFCL Marlins
| Jupiter
| 1998
| align="right" | 7,200
| 
|}

Map

Gallery

See also

List of Arizona Complex League stadiums

References

External links

 
Florida Complex League
Florida Complex League stadiums